Felix Township is one of seventeen townships in Grundy County, Illinois, USA.  As of the 2010 census, its population was 4,427 and it contained 1,919 housing units.

History
Felix Township, Grundy County, is named for Felix Grundy, Senator from Tennessee. The township was formed from portions of Wauponsee and Aux Sable townships in November, 1854. Most of old Felix township was partitioned to form Goose Lake Township on September 15, 1897. These early boundary changes occurred mainly due to coal mining activity.

Geography

Cities, towns, villages
 Carbon Hill
 Coal City (north quarter)
 Diamond (west quarter)

Unincorporated towns
 Eileen at 
(This list is based on USGS data and may include former settlements.)

Demographics

School districts
 Coal City Community Unit School District 1

Political districts
 Illinois' 11th congressional district
 State House District 75
 State Senate District 38

References
 
 United States Census Bureau 2007 TIGER/Line Shapefiles
 United States National Atlas

External links
 City-Data.com
 Illinois State Archives

Townships in Grundy County, Illinois
Townships in Illinois
1854 establishments in Illinois
Populated places established in 1854